"Tristessa" is a song by American alternative rock band The Smashing Pumpkins. The single was the Pumpkins' second ever release, and their first, and only, release on Sub Pop. Sub Pop released it as their "Single of the Month". It was written by Billy Corgan and later re-recorded for their debut album, Gish. The title is a direct allusion to Jack Kerouac's 1960 novella of the same name. There were about 4,000 of the original 7" single pressed in pink vinyl, while the rest were pressed in black vinyl. A failure to change the wax color between pressings resulted in about 100 that were pressed in grey-colored wax. These are especially rare and have sold for several hundred dollars apiece.

Following the release of "Tristessa", the Smashing Pumpkins were targets of a bidding war by multiple record labels, and ended up signing to Caroline Records. Unlike "I Am One", which was also re-recorded for Gish, "Tristessa" did not receive a second single release, and neither version of the song appears on the 2001 greatest hits collection, Rotten Apples.

Critical reception 
CMJ called it "a grinding, drawled-out, lascivious rocker with a chisel-sharp pop aesthetic". The Chicago Sun-Times said it was an "epic rocker". In 2007, Spinner wrote, "a decade after the onset of diminishing returns, 'Tristessa' remains an absolute monster".

Track listing
All songs written by Billy Corgan

"Tristessa" – 3:40
"La Dolly Vita" – 4:15
"Honeyspider" – 2:55 (present on UK 12" only)

References 

The Smashing Pumpkins songs
1990 singles
Songs written by Billy Corgan
Song recordings produced by Billy Corgan
Song recordings produced by Butch Vig
1990 songs
Sub Pop singles
Alternative metal songs
American hard rock songs
Grunge songs